Oleg Sergeevich Stepanov (10 December 1939 – 27 February 2010) was a sambo and judo competitor. Domestically he was mostly known for sambo, which was a very popular sport in the Soviet Union, albeit with a limited international recognition. Between 1958 and 1968 Stepanov won eight national titles in sambo. Internationally he competed in judo, which has similar rules to sambo. The first Soviet judo team was formed in 1962 from the best sambo competitors, including Stepanov, and in 1963 it showed its strength in Europe and Japan. Later Stepanov won bronze medals at the 1964 Olympics and 1965 World Championships, as well as European titles in 1965 and 1966.

After retiring from competitions Stepanov coached sambo and judo at the Moscow Armed Forces Sports Club, for which he competed previously. In the late 1970s he trained the national women's judo team.

References

External links
 
 Олег Сергеевич Степанов. zvyaginec.ru (photo gallery)
 Умер легендарный борец Олег Степанов. wrestlingua.com. 2 March 2010 (interview in Russian)

1939 births
2010 deaths
Russian male judoka
Soviet male judoka
Judoka at the 1964 Summer Olympics
Olympic judoka of the Soviet Union
Olympic bronze medalists for the Soviet Union
Armed Forces sports society athletes
Olympic medalists in judo
Medalists at the 1964 Summer Olympics